The women's football tournament at the 2015 Military World Games was held in Mungyeong in South Korea from 1st to 10 October.

Squads

Group stage

Group A

Group B

Knockout stage

Semifinals

Classification 5-6

Third place match

Final

Final ranking

External links
Football competition summary - Official website of the 2011 Military World Games

Football Women
Military World Games
2015 Women
2015 Women
Mili